Flint Run may refer to:

Flint Run Archeological District, also known as the Flint Run Complex, in Virginia
Flint Run (West Virginia), a stream